Charisma is either  compelling attractiveness or charm that can inspire devotion in others, or a divinely conferred power or talent.

Charisma or Charismatic may also refer to:

Religion 
 Charisma (magazine), a magazine for charismatic Christians
 Charisma Christian Church, a French evangelical megachurch
 Charismatic Christianity, an umbrella term for Pentecostals and the Charismatic movement
 Charismatic movement, a subset of the Christian belief system

Arts and entertainment 
 Charisma (film), a 1999 film directed by Kiyoshi Kurosawa
 Charisma, a 2002 novel written by Steven Barnes
 Charisma Records, a record label for progressive rock bands
 Charisma (album), a 1966 jazz album by Lee Morgan
 "Charisma", a song from the Kiss album Dynasty
 Charisma, an attribute commonly used in role-playing games

People 
 Charisma Carpenter (born 1970), American actress
 Charisma Amoe-Tarrant (born 1999), olympic athlete

Plants and animals 
 Charisma (horse), a horse that won several gold medals in the sport of eventing
 Charismatic (horse), 1999 Kentucky Derby and Preakness Stakes winner
 Charisma (gastropod), a genus of sea snail in the family Trochidae
 Charisma (elm hybrid)

Software 
 Micrografx Charisma, a charting application

See also
 Charismatic authority, a sociology term coined by Max Weber
 Charism, in general denotes any good gift that flows from God's love to man
 Charizma (1973–1993), hip-hop artist
 Karisma Kapoor (born 1974), Indian actress
 Karishma (disambiguation), a feminine name of Sanskrit origin